Senior Mandrake is a 2010 Indian Malayalam-language comedy-drama film directed by Ali Akbar. It is a sequel to the 1997 film Junior Mandrake. Jagathy Sreekumar, Jagadish and Kalpana plays the lead roles.

Plot 
Kuttan has become enviably rich, and has disposed of the ill-fated statue, but soon it finds its way back to the money lender's doorstep. Without any further delay, the world starts crumbling around him, and he frantically scurries around to hand it over to some unfortunate soul.

Cast 
 Jagathy Sreekumar as Omanakuttan
 Kalpana as Vandana
 Jagadish as Pradeep
 Kalabhavan Navas as Sandeep
 Suraj Venjaramood as S.I. kidukkan
 Mamukkoya
 Salim Kumar
 Bijukuttan
 Kochu Preman
 Bindu Panicker
 Indrans as Gopalan
 Mala Aravindan as Maniyan Vaidyan
 Kanakalatha
 Appa Haja
 Jaffar Idukki

Reception
The film received  negative reviews criticizing direction, editing and poor level of making. Rediff.com rated the film 1 out of 5 stars and wrote "Avoid Senior Mandrake"

References

External links

 https://web.archive.org/web/20101204055501/http://popcorn.oneindia.in/title/7229/senior-mandrake.html

2010 films
2010s Malayalam-language films
Indian sequel films
Mandrake2